The Communal Depot of the Foreign Regiments (DCRE), or , was the primary training formation of the Foreign Legion from 1933 to 1955.

History
The Communal Depot of the Foreign Regiments (D.C.R.E) was created on 13 October 1933. The DCRE included a staff, a training battalion, a transit battalion, and depots in Toul, Marseille, Oran, and Arzew.  The Communal Depot of the Foreign Regiments was administratively dependent on the 1st Foreign Infantry Regiment.

From 1 April 1942, the D.C.R.E became a formed unit corps (the equivalent of a regiment) and was commanded by a senior colonel; the highest ranked colonel amongst all Foreign Legion regimental commanders. This senior colonel of the D.C.R.E acts as a general inspector vis-à-vis of the minister.

On 1 September 1950, the functions of the D.C.R.E are delegated to the Autonomous Group of the Foreign Legion (G.A.L.E) which took over temporarily from the Inspection of the Foreign Legion (I.L.E) ; the (I.L.E) that would later constitute the Foreign Legion Command. The D.C.R.E in the meantime changed name to the Communal Depot of the Foreign Legion (D.C.L.E). From 1950 to 1955, the newly renamed D.C.L.E was charged with running staffing operations, administration and the affairs of combat companies in transit. The D.C.L.E dissolved on 1 July 1955 and its mission was taken over by the 1st Foreign Regiment.

Insignia 
Two hemispheres, one red and one green, masking a grenade with 7 flames placed on top of the inscription: French Foreign Legion, The two hemispheres represent simultaneously the implementation of the Legion at quartier Viénot at Sidi-bel-Abbès and the relic monument aux morts of the D.C.R.E, responsible of traditions in mounting the guard. The green and red colors with the grenade with 7 flames are the traditional marks of the Foreign Legion. The Insignia was created in 1946 by Colonel Gaultier, highest Legion ranking regimental commander of the D.C.R.E.

Organization
Headquarters Staff
Instruction/Training Battalion
Transit Battalion
Four Operations Depots
Depot at Arzew
Depot at Marseilles
Depot at Oran
Depot at Toul

See also

Major (France)
French Foreign Legion Music Band (MLE)
French Foreign Legion recruit training

References

Defunct French Foreign Legion units
Army training units and formations
Buildings and structures in Sidi Bel Abbès Province
French Algeria
Military parachuting training
Military units and formations established in 1933
1933 establishments in France
1955 disestablishments in France